George "Geordie" Ker (born in Glasgow) was a Scottish footballer of the 1870s and 1880s.

Ker played for Queen's Park Juniors, Kerland FC, and Alexandra Athletic before joining Queen's Park in 1877. Until 1878, Ker had played as a defender but converted to a striker in 1878. He won the Scottish Cup in 1880, 1881 and 1882, scoring in the 1882 replay win over Dumbarton.

He was capped five times by the Scotland national team, scoring ten goals including a hat-trick against England in March 1880.

In July 1884 he emigrated to North America.

His older brother William was also a Scotland international, winning two caps, including the first international against England on 30 November 1872.

International goals
Scores and results list Scotland's goal tally first.

See also
 List of Scotland national football team hat-tricks

References

External links
Profile at IFFHS

London Hearts profile

Scottish footballers
Scotland international footballers
Queen's Park F.C. players
Year of birth missing
Year of death missing
Footballers from Glasgow
Place of death missing
Scottish expatriates in the United States
Association football forwards